The Esso Standard Oil Service Station is a former automobile service station at 1600 West 3rd Street in Little Rock, Arkansas.  It is a single story rectangular building, built out of concrete blocks and finished with a baked enamel on steel exterior.  It has three service bays on the left side, with original overhead glass-paned doors, and an office and sales space on the right side.  The right side has a short canopy protruding from it, also built of concrete with a baked enamel finish.  Built in 1957, it is a rare mid-century service station in the city.

The building was listed on the National Register of Historic Places in 2016.

See also
National Register of Historic Places listings in Little Rock, Arkansas

References

Gas stations on the National Register of Historic Places in Arkansas
Tudor Revival architecture in Arkansas
Commercial buildings completed in 1957
Transportation in Little Rock, Arkansas
National Register of Historic Places in Little Rock, Arkansas
1957 establishments in Arkansas
ExxonMobil buildings and structures